Carmen Arlene Balthrop (May 14, 1948 – September 5, 2021) was an American operatic soprano from Washington, D.C.

Career 
She made her Metropolitan Opera debut as Pamina in Mozart's Die Zauberflöte and performed on Broadway in the title role of Scott Joplin's opera Treemonisha. She served as professor of voice at the University of Maryland.

National Public Radio included her National Gallery of Art Christmas performance as part of their 2000 Millennium Celebration. She performed in the 2000 production of Handel's Agrippina and in the 2010 premiere of Frank Proto's Shadowboxer.

Other major roles
 Cio-Cio-San in Madama Butterfly
 Violetta in La traviata
 Micaela in Carmen
 Liu in Turandot
 Donna Elvira in Don Giovanni
 Poppea in L'incoronazione di Poppea by Monteverdi
 Susannah in Susannah by Carlisle Floyd
 Treemonisha in Treemonisha by Scott Joplin
 Aurore in A Bayou Legend by William Grant Still

Death 
She died on September 5, 2021, aged 73. Her funeral was held at Immaculate Conception Church in Washington DC.

Discography
 Scott Joplin's Treemonisha
 Claudio Monteverdi's L'incoronazione di Poppea
 John Knowles Paine's Mass
 Leslie Burrs' Vanqui
 The Art of Christmas, Volume I
 The Art of Christmas, The Original

References

External links
 
 

1948 births
2021 deaths
American operatic sopranos
University of Maryland, College Park faculty
Singers from Maryland
Classical musicians from Maryland
20th-century African-American women singers
20th-century American women opera singers
African-American women opera singers
21st-century African-American women singers
21st-century American women opera singers